Calcium nitride is the inorganic compound with the chemical formula Ca3N2.  It exists in various forms (isomorphs), α-calcium nitride being more commonly encountered.

Structure
α-Calcium nitride adopts an anti-bixbyite structure, similar to Mn2O3, except that the positions of the ions are reversed: calcium (Ca2+) take the oxide (O2−) positions and nitride ions (N3−) the manganese (Mn3+).  In this structure, Ca2+ occupies tetrahedral sites, and the nitride centres occupy two different types of octahedral sites.

Synthesis and reactions
Calcium nitride is formed along with the oxide, CaO, when calcium burns in air. It can be produced by direct reaction of the elements: 
3 Ca  +  N2   →   Ca3N2

It reacts with water or even the moisture in air to give ammonia and calcium hydroxide:
Ca3N2  +  6 H2O   →   3 Ca(OH)2  +  2 NH3
Like sodium oxide, calcium nitride absorbs hydrogen above 350 °C:
Ca3N2 + 2 H2  →   2 CaNH + CaH2

General references

References

External links
 WebElements entry

Nitrides
Calcium compounds